Hauteville House is a house where Victor Hugo lived during his exile from France, located at 38 Rue Hauteville in St. Peter Port in Guernsey. In March 1927, the centenary year of Romanticism, Hugo's descendants Jeanne, Jean, Marguerite and François donated the house to the City of Paris. It currently houses an honorary consul to the French embassy at London and a Victor Hugo museum; house and garden are both open to the public.

19th Century

Built around 1800 by an English privateer, the house came into the possession of William Ozanne. It gained the reputation of being haunted by the spirit of a woman who had committed suicide, and remained unoccupied for several years.

Victor Hugo arrived in Guernsey in October 1855. He bought the house on 16 May 1856 with the revenues from the initial success of the publication of Les Contemplations. By owning it Hugo ensured that he could not be expelled from the island as Guernsey law prohibits the deporting of people with property on the island.

Hugo and his wife Adèle Foucher transformed, furnished and decorated the house during his exile from 1856 to 1870, and during a return visit in the summer of 1878. He named the house "Hautville", rather than Liberté, which had been his original intention. The house consists of four levels, with the top floor featuring a glazed lookout with a view of Saint Peter Port, Herm and Sark, and the islands near them. The garden is filled with trees and flowers that grow abundantly due to the mild climate.

20th and 21st Century

The City of Paris conserves the two houses that Victor Hugo lived in the longest : the Rohan-Guéménée mansion in Paris and the Hauteville House in Guernsey. Hauteville House was given to the City of Paris in 1927 by the descendants of Victor Hugo.

The structure of the building undertook a major renovation in 2008-9  and in 2017 an appeal was launched to pay for the renovation of internal decorations.

François Pinault donated £2.6m (€3m) to renovate the interior and the house reopened on 7 April 2019.

Gallery photos

References

External links

 Maisons de Victor Hugo Paris-Guernesey
 Office de tourisme de Guernesey

Victor Hugo
Buildings and structures in Guernsey
Buildings and structures in Saint Peter Port
Tourist attractions in Guernsey
Paris Musées